Orin Smith may refer to:
 Orin C. Smith (1942–2018), president and chief executive officer of Starbucks Corporation
 Orin R. Smith, chairman and chief executive officer of the Engelhard Corporation